Aṉangu is the name used by members of several Aboriginal Australian groups, roughly approximate to the Western Desert cultural bloc, to describe themselves. The term, which embraces several distinct "tribes" or peoples, in particular the Ngaanyatjarra, Pitjantjatjara and Yankunytjatjara groups, is pronounced with the stress on the first syllable: .

The term
The original meaning of the word is "human being, person", "human body" in a number of eastern varieties of the Western Desert Languages (which are in the Pama–Nyungan group of languages), in particular Pitjantjatjara and Yankunytjatjara. It is now used as an Aboriginal endonym by a wide range of Western Desert Language (WDL) peoples to describe themselves. It is rarely or never applied to non-Aboriginal people when used in English, although the word now has a dual meaning in Pitjantjatjara and Yankunytjatjara. It has come to be used also as an exonym by non-Aboriginal Australians to refer to WDL-speaking groups or individuals.

With regard to the term's distribution and spelling, the following table shows the main WDL dialects in which it is used (left column) along with the word spelled according to the orthography of that dialect (right column).

The reasons for the spelling variations are that some WDL dialects do not allow vowel-initial words—in these varieties the word begins with y; some orthographies use underlining (e.g. ṉ) to indicate a retroflex consonant, while others use a digraph (e.g. rn). Pitjantjatjara seems to be the best-known source for the word, but the underlining of the consonant is often ignored (or not understood) by English speakers, and is difficult to type, so the word is very commonly, but incorrectly, rendered as anangu.

Country
The Aṉangu dwell primarily in the Central Western desert, to the south of the traditional lands of the Arrernte and Walpiri peoples.

Culture
The inma is a cultural ceremony of Aṉangu women, involving song and dance and embodying the stories and designs of the tjukurpa (Ancestral Law, or Dreamtime). The ceremony carries camaraderie, joy, playfulness and seriousness, and may last for hours. There are many different inma, all profoundly significant to the culture.

Aṟa Irititja project
Aṟa Irititja (meaning "stories from a long time ago") is a project of Ara Irititja Aboriginal Corporation, which works in collaboration with the South Australian Museum and Anangu Pitjantjatjara Yankunytjatjara at Umuwa. The project began in 1994 with the aim of repatriating cultural items which had been "lost" over the years to Anangu of the Ngaanyatjarra, Pitjantjatjara and Yankunytjatjara lands. These included cultural artefacts, photographs, films and sound recordings. Some had ended up in the archives of public institutions, while others had been packed away in boxes and forgotten. By 2018, Ara Irititja had tracked down hundreds of thousands of items and made them available through interactive software, keeping them safe in a digital archive. Cultural priorities have been built into the software, and Anangu can navigate the database, add information, stories and reflections, and alert administrators to specific items requiring restricted access. This enables Anangu to have control over how their history and culture are presented to the world in future.

See also
 Angas Downs Indigenous Protected Area,
 Anangu Pitjantjatjara Yankunytjatjara (APY lands in South Australia)
 Maralinga, the home of Maralinga Tjarutja, and the site of the British nuclear tests in the 1950s.

Notes

Citations

Sources

External links

 Web portal for Anangu Pitjantjatjara, Yankunytjatjara and Ngaanyatjarra peoples, communities and organisations
 Description of Tjukurpa – the foundation of Anangu life at Department of Environment and Heritage

Australian Aboriginal words and phrases
Pitjantjatjara